"One World, One People" is the sixth episode and series finale of the American television miniseries The Falcon and the Winter Soldier, based on Marvel Comics featuring the characters Sam Wilson / Falcon and Bucky Barnes / Winter Soldier. It follows the pair as they team-up to fight the anti-nationalist Flag Smashers. The episode is set in the Marvel Cinematic Universe (MCU), sharing continuity with the films of the franchise. It was written by head writer Malcolm Spellman and Josef Sawyer, and directed by Kari Skogland.

Anthony Mackie and Sebastian Stan reprise their respective roles as Sam Wilson and Bucky Barnes from the film series, with Emily VanCamp, Wyatt Russell, Erin Kellyman, Julia Louis-Dreyfus, Danny Ramirez, Georges St-Pierre, Adepero Oduye, and Daniel Brühl also starring. Development began by October 2018, with Spellman hired to serve as head writer of the series. Skogland joined in May 2019. The episode sees Wilson accept the mantle of Captain America and wear a new costume, with the series' title changing to Captain America and the Winter Soldier in the end credits. Filming took place at Pinewood Atlanta Studios in Atlanta, Georgia, with location filming in the Atlanta metropolitan area and in Prague.

"One World, One People" was released on the streaming service Disney+ on April 23, 2021. The episode received generally positive reviews, with praise going to the acting, visuals, and Wilson's character arc, but it was considered to be weaker than the previous episodes and some critics felt it brought the series to an unsatisfying end by not concluding the various plot points effectively and having an abrupt characterization shift for John Walker (Russell). The episode received a Primetime Emmy Award nomination.

Plot 
Wearing a new Captain America uniform and flight suit from the Wakandans, Sam Wilson flies to New York to save the Global Repatriation Council (GRC) from the Flag Smashers' attack, with the help of Bucky Barnes and Sharon Carter, who had secretly traveled to New York. While Wilson fights Georges Batroc, the Flag Smashers take several GRC representatives as hostages. Wilson pursues a group of hostages taken in a helicopter, while Barnes pursues and intercepts a group in trucks. Karli Morgenthau sets one of the vehicles on fire to keep Barnes busy and escape with the other, but John Walker arrives and intervenes. Barnes succeeds in freeing the hostages from the burning truck and joins Walker in battling the Flag Smashers but is knocked into the pit of a construction site. Walker is overcome as well, and Morgenthau drives the remaining truck into the site. Walker chooses to let Morgenthau go to stop the truck from falling. Morgenthau and the remaining Flag Smashers attack him, and they all fall to the ground, but Wilson, having saved the hostages in the helicopter, arrives and catches the truck. As the hostages are freed, Batroc arrives and uses smoke grenades to allow the Flag Smashers to flee into the tunnels around the construction site.

Carter separates Morgenthau from the others and confronts Morgenthau for betraying her, revealing her identity as the Power Broker. Batroc attempts to blackmail Carter, but she kills him. Wilson comes to reason with Morgenthau, but Morgenthau refuses to listen to Wilson's pleas and fights with him once more, but when Morgenthau is about to shoot Wilson, Carter shoots her. Before dying, a tearful Morgenthau apologizes to Wilson. After the attack, Wilson convinces the GRC to postpone the vote to force the relocation of the Blip-displaced people that Morgenthau died fighting for and instead make efforts to help them.

The remaining Super Soldier Serum-enhanced Flag Smashers are captured, but they are killed by Helmut Zemo's butler Oeznik via a vehicle explosion while en-route to the Raft. Contessa Valentina Allegra de Fontaine gives Walker a new suit and asks him to become a U.S. Agent for tasks where they cannot use Captain America. Wilson takes Isaiah Bradley and his grandson Eli to the Smithsonian's Captain America exhibit, where he had a memorial dedicated to Bradley installed. Barnes makes amends with his friend, Yori Nakajima, telling him that he killed his son while he was the Winter Soldier and crosses off every other name on his list of people who needed closure from him. Leaving New York for Louisiana, he then joins Wilson and his friends and family for a celebratory cookout.

In a mid-credits scene, Carter receives a pardon from the United States government and is reinstated to her former position in the CIA. She later makes a phone call, informing someone that the Power Broker now has full access to the government's secrets.

Production

Development 
By October 2018, Marvel Studios was developing a limited series starring Anthony Mackie's Sam Wilson / Falcon and Sebastian Stan's Bucky Barnes / Winter Soldier from the Marvel Cinematic Universe (MCU) films. Malcolm Spellman was hired as head writer of the series, which was announced as The Falcon and the Winter Soldier in April 2019. Spellman modeled the series after buddy films that deal with race, such as 48 Hrs. (1982), The Defiant Ones (1958), Lethal Weapon (1987), and Rush Hour (1998). Kari Skogland was hired to direct the miniseries a month later, and executive produced alongside Spellman and Marvel Studios' Kevin Feige, Louis D'Esposito, Victoria Alonso, and Nate Moore. The sixth episode, titled "One World, One People", was written by Spellman and Josef Sawyer, and released on the streaming service Disney+ on April 23, 2021.

Writing 
Though the episode takes place mainly in New York City, no other heroes based in the city, such as Spider-Man, appear, since any such cameo appearance would not have belonged or fit organically to the story. Spellman did not believe John Walker "got off easy" in the episode, noting how his career had been destroyed and for someone in the military, "to get anything other than an honorable discharge, that's a big deal". Co-executive producer Zoie Nagelhout discussed why Sharon Carter's identity as the Power Broker was kept from Wilson and Barnes, saying Carter's larger conflict and mission did not involve them so "it wasn’t necessary to have to complicate her relationship with" them. Nagelhout and the writers believed it was more interesting for Carter to continue to have that duality. Spellman worked with Mackie on the speech Wilson gives to the Global Repatriation Council (GRC) members, with Mackie suggesting Wilson talk to one member instead of the television cameras so it was less about giving a speech and more about trying to convince one person.

Speaking about the mid-credits scene, Spellman said that from it, the audience would know "exactly what doors just got opened to an expanded universe", with VanCamp noting Carter "has a much bigger plan and it's not for the greater good like it used to be". Skogland tried moving the scene to different parts of the episode, but returned to keeping it as the mid-credits scene in order to cement the reveal of Carter as the Power Broker. Since Carter now "lives in a middle ground that is really compelling", Nagelhout hoped there would be further opportunities to continue to explore the character and "what shades of gray she might drift between".

Title change 
The end of the episode changes the series' title to Captain America and the Winter Soldier. Skogland noted there was "a lot of conversation" in regards to changing the title, such as where it would be placed in the episode, its subtlety, and its design; she believed Feige had suggested it appear at the end of the episode. Though "Winter Soldier" is retained in the new title, Spellman believed Barnes had "slayed that dragon", saying by the end of the series Barnes had "shed the burden of the Winter Soldier", found a family with Wilson, and felt what it was like to be a hero for the first time, believing Barnes was "now free to become something amazing". Spellman hoped the audience would "forget" how the title card appeared "as being an indicator of a commitment from Marvel". A version of the title was made to say "Captain America and the White Wolf" to reflect Barnes' character development in the series, but Spellman believed Marvel wanted to retain some of the original title and if both names were changed, "it might not have been as emotional of a landing because it’s too much math and too much evolution".

Casting 
The episode stars Anthony Mackie as Sam Wilson / Captain America, Sebastian Stan as Bucky Barnes / Winter Soldier, Emily VanCamp as Sharon Carter / Power Broker, Wyatt Russell as John Walker / U.S. Agent, Erin Kellyman as Karli Morgenthau, Julia Louis-Dreyfus as Valentina Allegra de Fontaine, Danny Ramirez as Joaquin Torres, Georges St-Pierre as Georges Batroc, Adepero Oduye as Sarah Wilson, and Daniel Brühl as Helmut Zemo. Also appearing are Carl Lumbly as Isaiah Bradley, Amy Aquino as Christina Raynor, Desmond Chiam as Dovich, Dani Deetee as Gigi, Indya Bussey as DeeDee, Renes Rivera as Lennox, Tyler Dean Flores as Diego, Elijah Richardson as Eli Bradley, Chase River McGhee as Cass, Aaron Haynes as AJ, Ken Takemoto as Yori, Miki Ishikawa as Leah, Rebecca Lines as Atwood, Jane Rumbaua as Ayla, Salem Murphy as Lacont, Nicholas Pryor as Oeznik, and Gabrielle Byndloss as Olivia Walker.

Design 
The museum at the end of the series featured an updated set from the Smithsonian museum in the beginning of the series. Original set dressing and props were shipped to Atlanta for filming, as art director Jennifer Bash had consulted with Marvel Studios on what equipment they needed. Production designer Ray Chan stated that the modern floating displays were influenced by "contemporary fashion shows" and that the light boxes were re-purposed and reused from the Madripoor sets. Interactive monitor displays in the set were also designed by the team while the sculpture of Isiah Bradley was exclusively created for the episode. Wilson's entrance as Captain America included white lights as Costume designer Michael Crow stated that it added "a level of hope and light" to the ending of the series.

Filming and visual effects 
Filming took place at Pinewood Atlanta Studios in Atlanta, Georgia, with Skogland directing, and P.J. Dillon serving as cinematographer. Location filming took place in the Atlanta metropolitan area, including Downtown Atlanta and Atlantic Station, and in Prague. Skogland had originally intended to have Spellman make a cameo appearance as the citizen who says "That's Black Falcon!" when Wilson appears as Captain America to the public. The scene where de Fontaine anoints Walker as U.S. Agent was filmed in the same location from the previous episode where the government removed Walker as Captain America. Skogland thought there was irony to doing this, since his new future was starting where he lost his previous one.

Visual effects for the episode were created by Sony Pictures Imageworks, Weta Digital, Digital Frontier FX, QPPE, Stereo D, Cantina Creative, Technicolor VFX, Trixter, Crafty Apes, and Tippett Studio.

Music 
Selections from composer Henry Jackman's score for the episode were included in the series' Vol. 2 soundtrack album, which was released digitally by Marvel Music and Hollywood Records on April 30, 2021.

Marketing 
On March 19, 2021, Marvel announced a series of posters that were created by various artists to correspond with the episodes of the series. The posters were released weekly ahead of each episode, with the sixth poster, designed by Luke Butland (Lost Mind), being revealed on April 19. After the episode's release, Marvel announced merchandise inspired by the episode as part of its weekly "Marvel Must Haves" promotion for each episode of the series, including apparel, accessories, Funko Pops and other figurines, toys, costumes, and a themed Monopoly set, all focusing on Wilson as Captain America and updated designs for Barnes and Walker.

Reception

Audience viewership 
Nielsen Media Research, who measure the number of minutes watched by United States audiences on television sets, listed The Falcon and the Winter Soldier as the most-watched original series across streaming services for the week of April 19 to 25, 2021. This was the same ranking as the previous week, though the minutes of the series viewed during the week was down slightly to 796 million across all six of the series' episodes.

Critical response 
The review aggregator website Rotten Tomatoes reported a 72% approval rating with an average score of 6.8/10 based on 29 reviews. The site's critical consensus reads, "While "One World, One People" delivers a fitting ending for Sam, its rush to wrap The Falcon and The Winter Soldier many threads may leave some fans wanting—and wondering if there will be a second season to help make amends."

Rolling Stones Alan Sepinwall felt that the series "crashes and burns" with "One World, One People", stating, "It's a mess in nearly every way, with even the parts that work feeling rushed and unearned, carried largely by the performers rather than the storytelling". He felt that the action sequences were hard to follow, given the way they were edited and the dark settings many were in. Sepinwall described it as "a particular bummer" and "a visual muddle" since Wilson's debut as Captain America should have been "a triumphant moment that showcases how good Sam is in the role". He criticized Wilson's costume as "goofy", despite its faithfulness to the comics, and was disappointed in the various antagonists of the series, feeling that the writers never fully realized Morgenthau's motivations, and disappointed that Walker reverted to being a hero again after being set up in the previous episode as a "compelling" secondary antagonist. He believed that much of the episode was about setting up future content in the MCU rather than "serving this show's story", in a similar way to the final episode of WandaVision.

Writing for IGN, Matt Purslow gave "One World, One People" a 5 out of 10, believing the episode "struggle[d] under the weight of the many threads" the series had to conclude, resulting in a "messy, unsatisfying" conclusion. Purslow criticized the pacing of the episodes, and felt that the action at times got in the way of more deserving plot elements such as greater exploration of Morgenthau and Walker, who both had "underwhelming parts to play" in the finale. Purslow also felt that Carter's reveal as the Power Broker and Zemo's final attack on the Flag Smashers from prison were both unearned. One of the stronger elements of the episode for Purslow was Wilson becoming Captain America, particularly his speech to the GRC which was Wilson's "shining moment", and felt that Wilson establishing the Isaiah Bradley tribute was "a fantastic final statement" for the series' discussion of race. Writing for The Hollywood Reporter, Richard Newby felt Wilson's speech to the GRC was "beautifully worded", with the speech "hearken[ing] back to Sam's comic book origins as the son of a preacher who knew a thing or two about powerful words". Newby also felt that Isaiah Bradley's statue was relevant "considering the statues of Confederate soldiers and colonizers that still stand in America", and that "we have become so inundated with images of Black Americans being beaten down on our screens" that to see Wilson triumph was "almost an alien feeling".

Like Sepinwall, Christian Holub of Entertainment Weekly took issue with Walker's portrayal in the episode, saying his banter with Barnes after trying to kill each other last episode proved that the series "didn't really know what to do with any of its characters". The "most insufferable part of this episode" was Wilson's "wannabe Aaron Sorkin lecture" that had "a weird racial element" to it, since it continued the storytelling trend of the series to explain things rather than showing. Holub believed this was one of the reasons the Flag Smashers did not connect with the audience since their motivations were based on "monotonous exposition and dialogue that just stated facts rather than showing us story". Though Holub did enjoy the fact that Wilson's suit was an exact replica from the comics and felt it was enjoyable to see him fly while wielding the shield, he ultimately was left "disappointed" and "feeling kind of hollow" by the end of the series, giving the episode a "C".

Noel Murray said in The New York Times that the audience would have been pleased with the finale if they came to the series each week "to see big-budget super-heroics" but would have been disappointed if looking for character moments. Murray believed Barnes had "the cleanest and most heartening" story of all the major characters, while it was "harder to know what to make of the endings" for Zemo, Morgenthau, and Carter, calling it "an odd choice to center on Sharon at the end" since it made "the show's entire thematic and narrative focus feel misdirected". Sulagna Misra at The A.V. Club enjoyed Wilson's speech and that Wilson is "a normal person, and he knows how much normal people can do", but took issue with Morgenthau's characterization. Misra entered the episode with low expectations since she felt like the series "was doing a lot and didn’t seem to know how to hold it together, while also taking its time for a show that only has 6 episodes". Though far from perfect, the episode reminded Misra of the fun she had seeing Captain America: The Winter Soldier in theaters, with Misra giving "One World, One People" a "B+".

Accolades 
For the 73rd Primetime Creative Arts Emmy Awards, Matthew Wood, Bonnie Wild, James Spencer, Richard Quinn, Steve Slanec, Kimberly Patrick, Teresa Eckton, Frank Rinella, Devon Kelley, Larry Oatfield, Anele Onyekwere, Dan Pinder, Ronni Brown, and Andrea Gard were nominated for Outstanding Sound Editing for a Comedy or Drama Series (One-Hour) for their work on the episode.

References

External links 
 
 Episode recap at Marvel.com

2021 American television episodes
American television series finales
Television episodes about racism
Television episodes set in Baltimore
Television episodes set in Louisiana
Television episodes set in New York City
Television episodes set in Washington, D.C.
Television episodes written by Malcolm Spellman
The Falcon and the Winter Soldier episodes
Television episodes set in the 2020s